William Andrew Sutherland (May 30, 1849 – March 11, 1908) was an American lawyer and politician from New York.

Life 
Sutherland was born on May 30, 1849 in Hopewell, New York. He was the son of Rev. Andrew Sutherland and Mary McLean. He attended the Genesee Wesleyan Seminary and Genesee College in Lima, New York. He was a member of the Psi Upsilon fraternity.

After finishing school, Sutherland read law in the office of future New York Supreme Court Justice Edwin A. Nash. He was admitted to practice in 1874. He practiced in Lima until 1876, when he moved to Mount Morris. He served as Clerk of the Livingston County Board of Supervisors in 1876, 1878, and 1879. He moved to Rochester in 1884.

In the 1891 New York state election, Sutherland was the Republican candidate for Attorney General of New York, but he lost the election to Simon W. Rosendale. He was a member of the Republican National Committee from 1892 to 1896. He was a delegate to the 1896 Republican National Convention.

Sutherland was an associate consul for the Lexow Committee. He was president of the Rochester Bar Association and corporation counsel for Rochester. He was also a director of the Central Bank of Rochester.

Sutherland became a mason in 1870, and later joined the Scottish Rite, the Royal Arch Masonry, the Order of the Eastern Star, and the Knights Templar. In 1897, he was elected Grand Master of the Grand Lodge of New York. He was also an honorary Grand Master of the Grand Lodge of Canada.

He married Inez L. Jackson in 1878. They had one son, Carroll Arthur. After Inez died in 1905, Sutherland married Clara E. Bowen. His brother was Judge Arthur E. Sutherland, a New York Supreme Court Justice.

William was a Methodist until 1905, at which point he became a Presbyterian.

Sutherland died in Rochester City Hospital on March 11, 1908, a few weeks after he was appointed counsel for the New York Public Service Commission's Second District. He began suffering from a nervous breakdown. He was buried in Creekside Cemetery in Churchville.

References

External links 
 The Political Graveyard
 

1849 births
1908 deaths
People from Hopewell, New York
Genesee Wesleyan Seminary alumni
People from Lima, New York
Psi Upsilon
People from Mount Morris, New York
Lawyers from Rochester, New York
Politicians from Rochester, New York
New York (state) Republicans
19th-century American politicians
American Freemasons
Order of the Eastern Star
Masonic Grand Masters
Methodists from New York (state)
Presbyterians from New York (state)
Burials in New York (state)
Republican National Committee members